Ruz Gireh (also Romanized as Rūz Gīreh; also known as Rūzeh Gīreh) is a village in Chamsangar Rural District, Papi District, Khorramabad County, Lorestan Province, Iran. At the 2006 census, its population was 134, in 19 families.

References 

Towns and villages in Khorramabad County